Puerto Rico Highway 200 (PR-200) is a road located in Vieques, Puerto Rico. This highway extends from Mosquito to Puerto Diablo, passing through Isabel II (downtown Vieques).

Route description

This highway stretches east and west from Isabel II. The PR-200 East extends from the urban area to the municipal landfill in the Santa María sector, and the PR-200 West extends from Isabel II towards the southwest by the urban area, where Calle Carlos Le Brum is assigned to its intersection with Calle Muñoz Rivera. Then it changes its name to Calle San Francisco to the south until the PR-997, where it runs west through Florida, passing the PR-201 (km 2.5) and reaching the Martineau sector, following to the Gringo Beach. From this point it continues west, arrives at the Antonio Rivera Rodríguez Airport in Mosquito, passes PR-995 (km 6.6) until it reaches the old estrada of the military reservation (second gate) assigned to the municipality. At several points on this road there are narrow bridges that only provide space for a single vehicle.

Major intersections

Related route

Puerto Rico Highway 200R (abbreviated Ramal PR-200 or PR-200R) is a road that branches off from PR-200 in Isabel II. This highway begins at its intersection with Carlos Le Brum and Muñoz Rivera streets and runs through Plinio Peterson and Morropo streets. It crosses the Quebrada Cofresí and continues to the pier where the ferry docks, and then continues to the Punta Mulas Light, the Bravos de Boston neighborhood and the Santa María sector.

See also

 List of highways numbered 200

References

External links

 Culmina exitosamente rehabilitación de carretera PR-200 en Vieques 

200
Vieques, Puerto Rico